Burnley is a large market town in  Lancashire, England.

Burnley may also refer to:

People
 Burnley (surname)
 Burnley "Rocky" Jones (born 1941), Canadian political activist in the areas of human rights, race and poverty

Places

Australia 
 Burnley, Victoria, a suburb of Melbourne, Australia

Canada 
 Burnley, Ontario, a community in township of Alnwick/Haldimand

England 
 Burnley (borough)
 Burnley (UK Parliament constituency)

United States 
 Burnley, Virginia

Sports
 Burnley F.C., a football club based in Burnley, Lancashire

See also